Rachid Azzouzi (born 10 January 1971) is a Moroccan former football midfielder and current sporting director. Raised in Germany, he represented Morocco at international level.

Early life
Azzouzi was born in Taounate, Morocco, and moved as a child with his family to Germany. He was raised in Rhineland.

Club career
Azzouzi began playing as a youth for Hertha and Alemannia Mariadorf. In 1988, he moved to 1.FC Köln, where he would play for one year. He later played for several clubs, including MSV Duisburg from 1989 to 1995, Fortuna Köln for two years and then for SpVgg Greuther Fürth, but before which he played for half a year for Chongqing Lifan in China. In total, he played 260 second division games, in which he scored 30 goals. In his 64 Bundesliga games for MSV Duisburg he scored three times. In the 2004–05 Season he was coach of the Fürther U-17-Jugendmannschaft and was relegated with the team from the B-Jugend-Regionalliga.

International career
He played for the Morocco national football team and was a participant at the 1992 Summer Olympics, 1994 FIFA World Cup and at the 1998 FIFA World Cup.

Sporting director career
After the end of his playing career, Azzouzi served as assistant to the manager from 2005 to 2007, then Team-Manager in 2007-08, and then sporting director for SpVgg Greuther Fürth. On 25 May 2012, it was announced that Azzouzi will become the new sporting director of Germany second division club FC St. Pauli.  On 16 December 2014, he left his position in St. Pauli.
On 10 June 2015 he was signed a two-years contract as a sporting director of Fortuna Düsseldorf. However, this cooperation ended after just under a year, on 25 May 2016.

On 22 November 2017, Azzouzi returned to SpVgg Greuther Fürth as sporting director.

References

External links

Living people
1971 births
People from Fez, Morocco
Association football midfielders
Moroccan footballers
Morocco international footballers
Moroccan expatriate footballers
Bundesliga players
2. Bundesliga players
MSV Duisburg players
SpVgg Greuther Fürth players
SC Fortuna Köln players
Chongqing Liangjiang Athletic F.C. players
Expatriate footballers in Germany
Expatriate footballers in China
1994 FIFA World Cup players
1998 FIFA World Cup players
Olympic footballers of Morocco
Footballers at the 1992 Summer Olympics
1992 African Cup of Nations players
1998 African Cup of Nations players
Moroccan expatriate sportspeople in Germany
Moroccan expatriate sportspeople in China
FC St. Pauli managers
Moroccan football managers